Daniel Wolfram Gerlich (born 1972 in Frankfurt am Main, Germany) is a cell biologist. Since 2012 he has been a Senior Group Leader at the Institute of Molecular Biotechnology (IMBA) of the Austrian Academy of Sciences in Vienna.

Education and career 
Daniel Gerlich studied biology at the University of Freiburg in Germany. Following his graduation in 1998, he worked at German Cancer Research Center (DKFZ) and Ruprecht-Karls University Heidelberg, Germany, to obtain a PhD in 2002. That year, he started  postdoctoral research in the laboratory of Jan Ellenberg at the European Molecular Biology Laboratory (EMBL) in Heidelberg. In 2005 he was appointed Assistant Professor at the Institute of Biochemistry at the Swiss Federal Institute of Technology in Zurich (ETHZ). He moved to the Institute of Molecular Biotechnology (IMBA), part of the Vienna BioCenter, in 2012 to take up a Senior Group Leader position. Since 2014 he is also an Editorial Advisory Board Member of the Journal of Cell Science and from 2015 to 2019 was a member of the “Gentechnikkommission” – an advisory board of the Ministry of Health of the Austrian Government.

Research focus 
Gerlich's work investigates the spatial organization and biomechanics of human chromosomes. By combining cell biology, biophysics, biochemistry, and computer science approaches, he aims to elucidate how chromosomes reorganize during cell cycle progression and how they rebuild a cell nucleus after cell division.

His work has been awarded multiple grants from the WWTF, the FWF and two prestigious ERC grants.

Awards and honours 

 2005 European Young Investigator Award (EURYI Award) of the European Science Foundation
2009 elected EMBO Young Investigator
2012 Starting Grant – European Research Council
2017 elected EMBO member
2021 Advanced Grant – European Research Council

References 

Cell biologists
1972 births
Living people
21st-century German biologists
University of Freiburg alumni
Heidelberg University alumni